Moihuddin Khawja (born 15 July 1929) is a Pakistani former sports shooter. He competed in the trap event at the 1964 Summer Olympics.

References

External links
  

1929 births
Possibly living people
Pakistani male sport shooters
Olympic shooters of Pakistan
Shooters at the 1964 Summer Olympics
Place of birth missing (living people)